This is an English language bibliography of American Samoa and its  geography, history, inhabitants, culture, biota, etc.

American Samoa is an unincorporated territory of the United States located in the South Pacific Ocean, southeast of the sovereign state of Samoa (formerly known as Western Samoa).

History
  - published annually.

Military histories

Natural histories
 
Setchell, William Albert – American Samoa: Part I: Vegetation of Tutuila Island. Part II. Ethnobotany of the Samoans. Part III. Vegetation of Rose Atoll.

Political and social histories
 
Coulter, John Wesley - Land Utilization in American Samoa.
Emerson, Rupert, Lawrence S. Finkelstein, E. L. Bartlett, George H. McLane, and Roy E. James - America's Pacific Dependencies: A Survey of American Colonial Policies and of Administration and Progress toward Self-Rule in Alaska, Hawaii, Guam, Samoa, and the Trust Territory.
Freeman, Derek - The Fateful Hoaxing of Margaret Mead: A Historical Analysis of Her Samoan Research.
Freeman, Derek - Margaret Mead and Samoa: The Making and Unmaking of an Anthropological Myth.
Gilbert, Sandra M. - Wrongful Death: A Medical Tragedy.
Kirch, P. V. and T. L. Hunt - The To'aga Site: three millennia of Polynesian occupation in the Manu'a Islands, American Samoa.
 
Schramm, Wilbur, Lyle M. Nelson, and Mere T. Betham – Bold Experiment: The Story of Educational Television in American Samoa.
Sinavaiana-Gabbard, Caroline – Alchemies of Distance.
West, Francis J. - Political Advancement in the South Pacific: A Comparative Study of Colonial Practice in Fiji, Tahiti and American Samoa.

Fiction

Bibliographies

Notes

See also

Topic overview:
American Samoa
Outline of American Samoa
Index of American Samoa-related articles

Bibliographies of the United States and territories
American Samoa